Patricia Ann Reese (born 1950s) is an American former professional tennis player.

Reese grew up in St. Petersburg, Florida, where her father worked as a general surgeon. She won national championships as a junior and competed on the international tour during the 1970s. In 1975 she reached the third round of the Wimbledon Championships as a qualifier. She has been married to politician J. Edward Meyer since 1979.

References

External links
 
 

1950s births
Date of birth missing (living people)
Living people
American female tennis players
Tennis people from Florida
Sportspeople from St. Petersburg, Florida